"Hyperreal" is a song by British electronic music group The Shamen. After it was remixed by William Orbit, it was released on 25 March 1991 as the fourth single from their 1990 album En-Tact. A duet between Colin Angus and Plavka, it reached number 29 on the UK Singles Chart, their most successful single before the re-release of "Move Any Mountain" four months later. A remix 12-inch with remixes by Jack Dangers from Meat Beat Manifesto was released six weeks after the regular single, on 6 May  1991.

In the song, the title is not pronounced the usual way (hyper-real), but as four distinct syllables, with the stress on the second syllable: hy-per-ri-al. The kanji on the cover might be 吊 (tsu, suspended).

Allmusic's John Bush deemed the song an "infectious techno-pop anthem".

Versions

All released in 1991, except En-tact (1990) and On Air • The BBC Sessions (1993). The "Hyperreal" single was released in five different formats in the UK: 7", Cassette, CD, 12" and Remix 12".

References

1990 songs
1991 singles
The Shamen songs